Baron Charles Louis de Jaubert (19 April 1864 – 13 June 1935) was a French sport shooter who competed in the 1900 Summer Olympics and in the 1912 Summer Olympics.

He was born in Paris. In 1900 he finished seventh in the individual trap competition.

Twelve years later at the Stockholm Games he participated in the following events:

 team clay pigeons event - sixth place
 team 30 metre dueling pistol - sixth place
 100 metre running deer, double shots - tenth place
 individual trap - 25th place
 30 metre dueling pistol - 36th place

References

External links
 

1864 births
1935 deaths
French male sport shooters
Trap and double trap shooters
Running target shooters
ISSF pistol shooters
Olympic shooters of France
Shooters at the 1900 Summer Olympics
Shooters at the 1912 Summer Olympics
Barons of France
Place of death missing
Sport shooters from Paris